Merve Nur Eroğlu (born March 25, 1993) is a Turkish para-archer competing in the women's recurve bow event. She took part at the 2016 Summer Paralympics.

Early life
Merve Nur Eroğlu was born in Bolu, Turkey on March 25, 1993. She lives in her hometown.

At age of six, she became paralyzed following a traffic accident. She uses a wheelchair.

Sporting career
Eroğlu began with archery after finishing the high school in 2011. She trains at the sports hall of Bolu Police. She is coached by Ahmet Soner Mersinli.

She competed at the 2016 European Qualifier held in Saint-Jean-de-Monts, France, and obtained a quota spot for 2016 Paralympics in Rio de Janeiro, Brazil.

In 2021, she won the bronze medal in the Individual  and the silver medal in the Mixed team event together with her teammate Sadık Savaş at the 7th Fazza Para Archery World Ranking Tournament held in Dubai, United Arab Emirates.

References

1993 births
Living people
Sportspeople from Bolu
Turkish female archers
Paralympic archers of Turkey
Wheelchair category Paralympic competitors
Archers at the 2016 Summer Paralympics
People with paraplegia
20th-century Turkish sportswomen
21st-century Turkish sportswomen
Islamic Solidarity Games medalists in archery